Barstowite, formula Pb4[Cl6|CO3]•H2O, is a transparent to white mineral in the monoclinic system. It has a Mohs hardness of 3, a white streak and an adamantine lustre.

The type locality for Barstowite is Bounds Cliff, St Endellion, Cornwall in the United Kingdom. It is named after Richard W. Barstow (1947–1982), a Cornish mineral collector.

References

Lead minerals
Carbonate minerals
Halide minerals
Monoclinic minerals
Minerals in space group 11